Shushk may refer to:
 Shushk, Khusf, South Khorasan
 Shushk, Zirkuh, South Khorasan